Elizabeth Grace Gorman (born March 30, 1987, in Syracuse, New York) is an American football player for the Los Angeles Temptation in the Lingerie Football League (LFL).  Her LFL awards include 2010 Defensive Player of the Year, and being named an All-Star in 2010 and 2011.  She was also a Defensive Player of the Year nominee in 2011. She also previously played soccer.

Early life
Gorman attended Hamilton Central High School, where she played varsity basketball, soccer and softball.  In 2001, she was a member of the school soccer team that won regionals and state, contributing two goals in the semi-finals. She then attended Stockdale High School for the next two years where she played soccer and graduated in 2004.  After tearing her anterior cruciate ligament in the Valley semi-finals, she took one year off, playing club and attended Bakersfield College, where she received her associate degree in art.

College

She earned a soccer scholarship to Judson University, where she played two soccer seasons, scoring 9 goals and recording 10 assists in 28 appearances. In 2007, she left to have knee surgery, recovering in Lakeland, Florida. She finished her degree in public relations and advertising while playing her last year of eligibility in soccer at Florida Southern College in the Sunshine State Conference, was honored as NCAA player of the week during the 2008–2009 season and helped her team reach the second round of the NCAA tournament. In total, she scored 11 goals and recorded  10 assists in 40 appearances for Florida Southern.

Career
Gorman entered the LFL by signing as a free agent with the Tampa Breeze late in the pre-season of the Lingerie Football League's inaugural season in 2009–2010 and has played for the Breeze for each of the first two seasons.  She was named LFL Defensive player of the Year and to the All-Fantasy team in 2010, helping the East to victory in the All-Fantasy Game played in Monterey, Mexico and won by the East, 36–14.  In 2011, the team fell short of the Championship game, but she was again nominated for the LFL Defensive Player of the Year award and was named to her second All-Fantasy team.  Gorman shared the game's Most Valuable Player award for helping to lead the East to a comeback 23–18 win. In 2013, she signed with the Los Angeles Temptation but missed most of the season due to an injury. As a fitness model, she appeared in a three-page spread in Women's Running magazine. She has wrestled from 2011 to 2012 for Grapplinggirls.

LFL Stats

References

1987 births
Living people
Female models from New York (state)
Players of American football from Syracuse, New York
American sportswomen
Legends Football League players
Bakersfield College alumni
Judson University alumni
Florida Southern College alumni
American women's soccer players
Women's association football midfielders
Women's association football forwards
Soccer players from New York (state)
Florida Southern Moccasins soccer